Aimé Nzohabonayo (born 7 September 1989) is a Burundian professional footballer, who plays as a forward for AS Inter Star in the Burundi Football League.

International career
He was invited by Lofty Naseem, the national team coach, to represent Burundi in the 2014 African Nations Championship held in South Africa.

References

Living people
1989 births
Burundi A' international footballers
2014 African Nations Championship players
Burundian footballers

Association football forwards